Luxor University (Arabic: جامعة الأقصر) is an Egyptian public university in Luxor Governorate. In the past, it was branch of South Valley University.

Faculties 

 Faculty of Computing and Information
 College of Fine Arts
 College of Al-Alsun
 Faculty of Archaeology
 Faculty of Tourism and Hotels
 Faculty of Education
 Faculty of Medicine
 College of Nursing

References 

Universities in Egypt